Hidden Lake or Hidden Lakes may refer to:

Lakes
 Hidden Lake (Antarctica)
 Hidden Lake (Alberta), a lake in Banff National Park in Canada
 Hidden Lake (Vancouver Island), a lake in British Columbia, Canada

United States
 Hidden Lake (Alaska), a lake near the Kenai River
 Hidden Lake (Sawtooth Wilderness), a lake in Sawtooth National Recreation Area, Idaho
 Hidden Lake (White Cloud Mountains), a lake in Sawtooth National Recreation Area, Idaho
 Hidden Lake, a lake of Beaverhead County, Montana
 Hidden Lake, a lake of Carbon County, Montana
 Hidden Lake (Flathead County, Montana)
 Hidden Lakes, a series of eight lakes in Gallatin County, Montana
 Hidden Lake, a lake of Granite County, Montana
 Hidden Lake, a lake of Jefferson County, Montana
 Hidden Lake, a lake of Mineral County, Montana
 Hidden Lake, a lake of Missoula County, Montana
 Hidden Lake, a lake of Pondera County, Montana
 Hidden Lake, a lake of Ravalli County, Montana
 Hidden Lake, a lake of Sweet Grass County, Montana
 Hidden Lakes (Nevada), a lake in Elko County
 Hidden Lake (Skagit County, Washington)

Other uses
 Hidden Lake (horse), a Kentucky-bred mare
 Hidden Lake Academy, a boarding school in Dahlonega, Georgia
 Hidden Lake Airport, an airport in New Port Richey, Florida
 Hidden Lake Peaks, a series of peaks in Skagit County, Washington